The following outline is provided as an overview of, and a topical guide to, the U.S. state of Wisconsin:

Wisconsin – U.S. state located in the north-central United States and part of the Midwest. It is bordered by Minnesota to the west, Iowa to the southwest, Illinois to the south, Lake Michigan to the east, Upper Michigan to the northeast, and Lake Superior to the north. Wisconsin's capital is Madison, and its largest city is Milwaukee. In the 1890s, farmers in Wisconsin shifted from wheat to dairy production in order to make more sustainable and profitable use of their land.

General reference 

 Names
 Common name: Wisconsin
 Pronunciation: 
 Official name: State of Wisconsin
 Abbreviations and name codes
 Postal symbol:  WI
 ISO 3166-2 code: US-WI
 Internet second-level domain: .wi.us
 Nicknames
 America's Dairyland (currently used on license plates)
 Badger State
 Demonym: Wisconsinite

Geography of Wisconsin 

Geography of Wisconsin
 Wisconsin is a U.S. state, a federal state of the United States of America
 Location
 Northern Hemisphere
 Western Hemisphere
 Americas
 North America
 Anglo America
 Northern America
 United States of America
 Contiguous United States
 Central United States
 East North Central States
 Midwestern United States
 Great Lakes Region
 Population of Wisconsin: 5,686,986  (2010 U.S. Census)
 Area of Wisconsin:
 Atlas of Wisconsin

Places in Wisconsin 
 Ice Age Trail
 List of bike trails in Wisconsin
 List of hiking trails in Wisconsin
 National Historic Landmarks in Wisconsin
 National Natural Landmarks in Wisconsin
 State parks in Wisconsin
 National Register of Historic Places listings in Wisconsin
 Bridges on the National Register of Historic Places in Wisconsin
 Rustic Roads

Environment of Wisconsin 
 Climate of Wisconsin
 State forests of Wisconsin
 Superfund sites in Wisconsin
 Birds of Wisconsin
 Ecoregions of Wisconsin

Natural geographic features of Wisconsin 
 Lakes of Wisconsin

Regions of Wisconsin 

 Central Wisconsin

Administrative divisions of Wisconsin 

Political subdivisions of Wisconsin
 The 72 counties of the state of Wisconsin
 Cities in Wisconsin
 State capital of Wisconsin:
 City nicknames in Wisconsin
 Villages in Wisconsin
 Towns in Wisconsin

Demography of Wisconsin 

Demographics of Wisconsin

Government and politics of Wisconsin 

Politics of Wisconsin
 Form of government: U.S. state government
 United States congressional delegations from Wisconsin
 Wisconsin State Capitol
 Elections in Wisconsin
 Political party strength in Wisconsin

Branches of the government of Wisconsin 

Government of Wisconsin

Executive branch of the government of Wisconsin 
 Governor of Wisconsin
 Lieutenant Governor of Wisconsin
 Secretary of State of Wisconsin
 State Treasurer of Wisconsin
 State departments
 Wisconsin Department of Administration
 Wisconsin Department of Agriculture, Trade & Consumer Protection
 Wisconsin Department of Children and Families
 Wisconsin Department of Commerce
 Wisconsin Department of Corrections
 Wisconsin Department of Employee Trust Funds
 Wisconsin Department of Financial Institutions
 Wisconsin Department of Health Services
 Wisconsin Department of Justice
 Wisconsin Department of Military Affairs
 Wisconsin Department of Natural Resources
 Wisconsin Department of Public Instruction
 Wisconsin Department of Revenue
 Wisconsin Department of Safety and Professional Services
 Wisconsin Department of Tourism
 Wisconsin Department of Transportation
 Wisconsin Department of Veterans Affairs
 Wisconsin Department of Workforce Development

Legislative branch of the government of Wisconsin 

 Wisconsin Legislature (bicameral)
 Upper house: Wisconsin Senate
 Lower house: Wisconsin State Assembly

Judicial branch of the government of Wisconsin 

Courts of Wisconsin
 Supreme Court of Wisconsin
 Wisconsin Court of Appeals
 Wisconsin Circuit Court

Law and order in Wisconsin 

 Cannabis in Wisconsin
 Capital punishment in Wisconsin
 Constitution of Wisconsin
 Crime in Wisconsin
 Gun laws in Wisconsin
 Law enforcement in Wisconsin
 Law enforcement agencies in Wisconsin
 Same-sex marriage in Wisconsin

Military of Wisconsin 

 Wisconsin Air National Guard
 Wisconsin Army National Guard

Local government in Wisconsin 

Political subdivisions of Wisconsin

History of Wisconsin 

History of Wisconsin

History of Wisconsin, by period 
Prehistory of Wisconsin
French colony of Canada, (1634–1763)
French colony of Louisiana, (1699–1764)
Treaty of Fontainebleau of 1762
Treaty of Paris of 1763
British (though predominantly Francophone) Province of Quebec, (1763–1783)-1791
American Revolutionary War, 1775–1783
United States Declaration of Independence of 1776
Treaty of Paris of 1783
Unorganized territory of the United States, 1783–1787
Territory Northwest of the River Ohio, (1787–1800)-1803
Territory of Indiana, (1800–1809)-1816
Territory of Illinois, 1809–1818
War of 1812, 1812–1815
Territory of Michigan, 1805–(1818–1836)-1837
Winnebago War, 1827
Black Hawk War, 1832
Territory of Wisconsin, 1836–1848
State of Wisconsin since May 29, 1848
Wisconsin in the American Civil War, 1861–1865

Culture of Wisconsin 

 Cuisine of Wisconsin
 Museums in Wisconsin
 Religion in Wisconsin
 Scouting in Wisconsin
 State symbols of Wisconsin
 Flag of the State of Wisconsin 
 Great Seal of the State of Wisconsin

The arts in Wisconsin 
 Music of Wisconsin

Sports in Wisconsin 

Sports in Wisconsin

Economy and infrastructure of Wisconsin 

Economy of Wisconsin

 Agriculture in Wisconsin
 Communications in Wisconsin
 Newspapers in Wisconsin
 Radio stations in Wisconsin
 Television stations in Wisconsin
 Energy in Wisconsin
 Power stations in Wisconsin
 Solar power in Wisconsin
 Wind power in Wisconsin
 Health care in Wisconsin
 Hospitals in Wisconsin
 Transportation in Wisconsin
 Airports in Wisconsin

Education in Wisconsin 

Education in Wisconsin
 Schools in Wisconsin
 School districts in Wisconsin
 High schools in Wisconsin
 Colleges and universities in Wisconsin
 University of Wisconsin System
 University of Wisconsin Colleges
 Wisconsin Technical College System

See also

Topic overview:
Wisconsin

Index of Wisconsin-related articles

References

External links 

Wisconsin
Wisconsin
 1